Khader El-Yateem (Arabic: خضر اليتيم ; born October 20, 1968) is a Palestinian-American community organizer and Lutheran pastor. He is the Director for Evangelical Mission Assistant to the Bishop (South Region) Florida-Bahamas Synod, ELCA. El-Yateem was a candidate for New York City Council.

Early life and education
El-Yateem was born in Beit Jala in the Bethlehem Governorate in 1968, and emigrated to the United States in 1992. He holds a Master of Divinity from the Lutheran Theological Seminary at Philadelphia, and a bachelor's degree from the Evangelical Theological Seminary in Cairo, Egypt.

Career
El-Yateem is the founder of Salam Arabic Lutheran Church. It is a congregation primarily consisting of recent immigrant Arab Christians, many of whom fled from the unrest in the Middle East. His work at the congregation has been praised by a fellow cleric, Bishop Gregory John Mansour, who has described him as "a great bridge builder."

El-Yateem was a clergy liaison to the NYPD, acting as a connection between the community and law enforcement. He is a co-founder of the Bay Ridge Unity Task Force, formed in 2000 by Muslim, Christian, and Jewish religious leaders, civic activists, and business leaders to combat post-9/11 bigotry.

In 2012, the Bay Ridge Community Council presented the Civic Award to El-Yateem for his work at Salam Arabic Lutheran Church and the Bay Ridge Unity Task Force.

El-Yateem has served on Brooklyn Community Board 10, and the boards of St. Nicholas Home and Lutheran Augustana Home for over a decade, and formerly worked at Maimonides Medical Center.

In 2017, El-Yateem began a campaign for New York City Council in District 43.

In August 2017, El-Yateem played a key role in getting the Episcopal Diocese of Long Island to remove a plaque commemorating Confederate General Robert E. Lee from a cemetery in Fort Hamilton, placed there by the United Daughters of the Confederacy, in the wake of the violence surrounding the Unite the Right rally to protest a similar memorial's removal in Charlottesville, Virginia.

In May 2018, El-Yateem announced he would be moving to Florida.

City Council
El-Yateem ran in the Democratic primary for New York City Council, District 43, covering Bay Ridge, Dyker Heights, Bensonhurst and Bath Beach. His campaign had been endorsed by organizations such as the New York State Immigrant Action Fund, the New Kings Democrats and the Democratic Socialists of America, of which he is a member. El-Yateem finished second in the primary with 31% of the vote to Justin Brannan's 39% in a five-way race.

References

1968 births
21st-century American Lutheran clergy
Palestinian emigrants to the United States
American politicians of Palestinian descent
Living people
Members of the Democratic Socialists of America
Palestinian Lutheran clergy
People from Brooklyn
20th-century American Lutheran clergy